Dalla riza is a species of butterfly in the family Hesperiidae. It is found in Colombia and Peru.

References

Butterflies described in 1889
riza
Hesperiidae of South America
Taxa named by Paul Mabille